Stictoleptura cordigera is a beetle species of flower longhorns belonging to the longhorn beetle family, subfamily Lepturinae.

Distribution
This beetle is mainly present in Spain, France, Belgium, Switzerland, Italy, Albania, Romania, Bulgaria, and Greece. It is also found in Turkey and North Iran.

Ecology

Larvae
Larvae are polyphagous and develop in rotten wood of deciduous trees, especially in Quercus ilex and Quercus suber, but also in Pistacia and Castanea species.

Adult

Description
The head, pronotum and abdomen are black, while elytra have a bright reddish colour with a specific black drawing. They are very common flower-visitors, especially in Apiaceae species, feeding on pollen and the nectar.

Subspecies
Stictoleptura cordigera cordigera (Fuesslin, 1775)
Stictoleptura cordigera illyrica (Müller, 1948)  
Stictoleptura cordigera anojaensis (Sláma, 1982)

References

External links
Cerambycoidea

Stictoleptura
Beetles of Asia
Beetles of Europe
Beetles described in 1775
Taxa named by Johann Kaspar Füssli